Gongdeok-dong is a legal dong (neighbourhood) of the Mapo-gu district in Seoul, South Korea. Gongdeok-dong is governed by its administrative dong, the office of Cheonyeon-dong.

Attractions 
 Human Resources Development Service of Korea
 Asojeong
 Gongdeok Market near Exit 4 of Gongdeok Station is on the Seoul list of Asia's 10 greatest street food cities for the haemul pajeon.

See also 
 Administrative divisions of South Korea

References

External links 
 Mapo-gu official website in English
 Map of Mapo-gu at the Mapo-gu official website
  Map of Mapo-gu  at the Mapo-gu official website
 Gongdeok-dong resident office website

Neighbourhoods of Mapo District